Ishaq Sambhali (also known with his honorific Maulana) was an Indian politician, freedom activist, journalist and the member of parliament from Amroha parliamentary constituency of Uttar Pradesh. He was imprisoned twice during the resistance movement of India. He was associated with Communist Party of India, and served as the parliament member twice during the fourth lok sabah and fifth lok sabah elections.

Politics 
Sambhali received his political education at Darul Uloom Deoband and University of Lucknow. He was initially associated with the Indian National Congress, the Kisan Mazdoor Praja Party and the Praja Socialist Party, and served as general secretary of the Congress in 1937 and Congress Committee Deoband in 1945. He was imprisoned twice during the Indian independence movement. Ashfaq was organising secretary of All India National Solidarity Council in 1963 and secretary of All India Peace Council in 1967. From 1968 to 1971, he served member of the Jamiat Ulema-e-Hind Uttar Pradesh.

Personal life
Sambhali was born on 6 October 1921 in the Thanabhawan town of Muzaffarnagar. He was born to Ahmad Hassan, and was married to Najma Begum in June 1953. He had two daughters and two sons.

References 

19th-century Indian politicians
India MPs 1967–1970
India MPs 1971–1977
1921 births
Place of death missing
People from Muzaffarnagar district
People from Uttar Pradesh
Uttar Pradesh politicians
Communist Party of India politicians from Uttar Pradesh
Deobandis
People from Sambhal district
1999 deaths